Helvering v. Davis, 301 U.S. 619 (1937), was a decision by the U.S. Supreme Court that held that Social Security was constitutionally permissible as an exercise of the federal power to spend for the general welfare and so did not contravene the Tenth Amendment of the U.S. Constitution.

The Court's 7–2 decision defended the constitutionality of the old-age benefit program of the Social Security Act of 1935 by requiring only welfare spending to be for the common benefit, as distinguished from some mere local purpose. It affirmed a District Court decree that held that the tax upon employees was not properly at issue and that the tax upon employers was constitutional.

Facts
A shareholder of the Edison Electric Illuminating Company brought a derivative action to restrain the company from making payments and deductions required by the Social Security Act of 1935 on the grounds that it was unconstitutional. He sought an injunction and a declaration that the Act was void.

Decision
The Supreme Court's decision in the case was written by Justice Benjamin N. Cardozo and supported the right of Congress to interpret the "general welfare" clause in the Constitution.

Joining the decision was Justice Harlan Stone, who during the drafting of the legislation had advised Secretary Frances Perkins that the constitutionality of Social Security could be based upon "The taxing power of the Federal Government, my dear; the taxing power is sufficient for everything you want and need."

See also
 Helvering vs. Davis - Supreme Court Opinion
 List of United States Supreme Court cases, volume 301
 United States v. Butler (1936)
 Steward Machine Company v. Davis (1937)
 Flemming v. Nestor (1960)

Further reading

References

External links
 

United States Constitution Article One case law
United States Supreme Court cases
United States Supreme Court cases of the Hughes Court
Taxing and Spending Clause case law
1937 in United States case law
Social Security lawsuits
Constitutional challenges to the New Deal